Darka Sar (also Romanized as Darkā Sar; also known as Darkeh Sar) is a village in Siyahrud Rural District, in the Central District of Juybar County, Mazandaran Province, Iran. At the 2006 census, its population was 422, in 106 families.

References 

Populated places in Juybar County